Philip Quinton (born November 16, 1999) is an American professional soccer player who plays as a defender for Columbus Crew in Major League Soccer.

Early years

Youth 
Born in Columbus, Ohio, Quinton grew up in Portland, Oregon, attending Grant High School. At high school, Quinton was team captain of the team along with co-captain, Eli Roberts as they went on to be state semifinalists, earning First-Team All-Conference and Second-Team All-State accolades in his senior year, as well been named a letterwinner. Whilst at high school, Quinton also played club soccer at the FC Portland academy, helping the club to be State Cup champions in 2013, State Cup finalists in 2012 and 2014 and State Cup semifinalists in both 2016 and 2017.

College 
In 2018, Quinton committed to playing college soccer at the University of Notre Dame, choosing Notre Dame over Dartmouth College. In four seasons with the Fighting Irish, Quinton made 58 appearances, scoring two goals and adding two assists. During his college career, he was a four-time ACC Honor Roll, CoSIDA Second Team Academic All-American, 2021 ACC All-Tournament Team, and 2021 All-ACC Third Team.

While at college, Quinton made a single appearance for Portland Timbers U23s during their 2021 season in the USL League Two.

Club career 
On January 11, 2022, Quinton was selected 25th overall in the 2022 MLS SuperDraft by Columbus Crew, who traded $50,000 of General Allocation Money to acquire the pick from Real Salt Lake. On March 17, 2022, Quinton signed a professional deal with MLS Next Pro side Columbus Crew 2 ahead of their inaugural season. On April 19, 2022, Quinton signed a short-team deal with Columbus' Major League Soccer team ahead of their Lamar Hunt U.S. Open Cup fixture against Detroit City, where he appeared on the bench. Following the 2022 season, he was released by Columbus. However, in February 2023, Quinton re-signed with Columbus Crew on an MLS contract.

Honors 
Columbus Crew 2
MLS Next Pro: 2022

References

External links 
 Philip Quinton at Notre Dame Fighting Irish
 Philip Quinton MLS bio
 

1999 births
Living people
American soccer players
Association football defenders
Columbus Crew draft picks
Columbus Crew players
Columbus Crew 2 players
Grant High School (Portland, Oregon) alumni
Major League Soccer players
MLS Next Pro players
Notre Dame Fighting Irish men's soccer players
Portland Timbers U23s players
Soccer players from Oregon
Sportspeople from Portland, Oregon
USL League Two players